Take Back is a 2021 American action thriller film directed by Christian Sesma and starring Mickey Rourke, James Russo, Michael Jai White and Gillian White. The film was released in the United States on June 18, 2021.

Cast
Mickey Rourke as Patrick, Jack
Michael Jai White as Brian
Gillian White as Zara  
James Russo as Schmidt
Jessica Uberuaga as Nancy
Chris Browning as Jerry Walker
Nick Vallelonga as Demarco

Production
Principal photography wrapped in August 2020.

Release
Shout! Studios acquired North American distribution rights to the film in February 2021. The film released theatres in the United States and to video on-demand and online retailers on June 18, 2021.

Reception
The film has a 20% rating on Rotten Tomatoes based on five reviews.

Phil Hoad of The Guardian awarded the film two stars out of five and wrote, "...this smalltown revenge thriller starts off well but takes a fatally long time to gather momentum."

Alan Ng of Film Threat rated the film a 6.5 out of 10 and wrote, "It’s a great film to relax at home with and enjoy a steady stream of light suspense and action… and support up-and-coming stars."

References

External links
 
 

2021 films
2021 action thriller films
American action thriller films
2020s English-language films
2020s American films